The Colgate Raiders represented Colgate University in the 2011–12 NCAA Division I women's ice hockey season.

Offseason

Recruiting

Exhibition

Regular season
October 7–8: In a pair of victories over the Lindenwood Lions, Brittany Phillips accumulated a total of 10 points. In the 7-2 victory on October 7, she notched two goals, while logging an assist. One of the goals was the game-winning goal.

The following day, she had seven points (two goals, five assists) in an 8-2 win. Of the four goals she scored, two were power play goals. Her seven points ranked second in program history for most points in one game. In addition, the five assists ranked second for most assists in one game.

In addition, Melissa Kueber registered six points in the sweep. On October 8, she led the team with four goals scored in an 8-2 triumph over the Lions. She also notched an assist. The four tallies tied for first in program history for most scores in one game.

Standings

Schedule

Conference record

Awards and honors
Melissa Kueber, ECAC Rookie of the Week (Week of October 17, 2011)
Brittany Phillips, ECAC Player of the Week (Week of October 17, 2011)
Kimberley Sass, ECAC Player of the Week (Week of February 6, 2012)

References

Colgate
Colgate Raiders women's ice hockey seasons